The  Dundalk, Newry and Greenore Railway (DNGR, DN&GR) was an Irish gauge railway in Ireland. It was conceived in the 1860s to provide a link between the towns in its title and the London and North Western Railway port at Greenore, from where a ferry service operated to Holyhead. It was opened between Greenore and Dundalk in 1873 and extended to Newry in 1876. The company operated a hotel at Greenore.

Ownership
The L&NWR owned the railway and at first provided its locomotives and rolling stock, with the locomotives coming from its Crewe Works. The railway passed to the London, Midland and Scottish Railway in 1923 but an agreement was reached in 1933 for the line to be worked by the Great Northern Railway. Because the partition of Ireland placed  an international frontier across the DN&G's Greenore – Newry line, it was not absorbed into either the Great Southern Railways in 1925 or the Ulster Transport Authority in 1948.

Closure
The line was closed on 31 December 1951 and was dissolved in 1957 by act of consent.

Preservation 

One six-wheeled coach, DNGR No. 1 built in 1909, a composite with a coupé compartment, has been preserved at the Ulster Folk and Transport Museum, Cultra.

Consideration was given to the preservation of locomotive No.1 Macrory but, in the end, no locomotives were preserved. It is believed that this was because of an ill-informed belief among those in charge of its fate that the locomotive was of a different track gauge to the rest of Ireland, due to the fact that it was built and owned by a British company, although this was not the case. All of the locomotive nameplates have been preserved.

However, a GNR 2-4-2T JT class locomotive, No. 93, which worked on the DNGR line under GNR operation, has also been preserved and is displayed with the DNGR coach in Cultra.

See also
Locomotives of the Dundalk, Newry and Greenore Railway
Newry, Warrenpoint and Rostrevor Railway - which ran on the other side of Carlingford Lough

References

Further reading

External links
 Dundalk, Newry and Greenore Railway history - irishrailwayana.com

Early British railway companies
Closed railways in Ireland
Closed railways in Northern Ireland
Railway lines opened in 1873
Railway lines closed in 1951
Irish gauge railways
London and North Western Railway